The Stanford torus is a proposed NASA design for a space habitat capable of housing 10,000 to 140,000 permanent residents.

The Stanford torus was proposed during the 1975 NASA Summer Study, conducted at Stanford University, with the purpose of exploring and speculating on designs for future space colonies (Gerard O'Neill later proposed his Island One or Bernal sphere as an alternative to the torus). "Stanford torus" refers only to this particular version of the design, as the concept of a ring-shaped rotating space station was previously proposed by Wernher von Braun and Herman Potočnik.

It consists of a torus, or doughnut-shaped ring, that is 1.8 km in diameter (for the proposed 10,000 person habitat described in the 1975 Summer Study) and rotates once per minute to provide between 0.9g and 1.0g of artificial gravity on the inside of the outer ring via centrifugal force.

Sunlight is provided to the interior of the torus by a system of mirrors, including a large non-rotating primary solar mirror.

The ring is connected to a hub via a number of "spokes", which serve as conduits for people and materials travelling to and from the hub. Since the hub is at the rotational axis of the station, it experiences the least artificial gravity and is the easiest location for spacecraft to dock. Zero-gravity industry is performed in a non-rotating module attached to the hub's axis.

The interior space of the torus itself is used as living space, and is large enough that a "natural" environment can be simulated; the torus appears similar to a long, narrow, straight glacial valley whose ends curve upward and eventually meet overhead to form a complete circle. The population density is similar to a dense suburb, with part of the ring dedicated to agriculture and part to housing.

Construction
The torus would require nearly 10 million tons of mass. Construction would use materials extracted from the Moon and sent to space using a mass driver. A mass catcher at L2 would collect the materials, transporting them to L5 where they could be processed in an industrial facility to construct the torus. Only materials that could not be obtained from the Moon would have to be imported from Earth. Asteroid mining is an alternative source of materials.

General characteristics
 Location: Earth–Moon L5 Lagrangian point
 Total mass: 10 million tons (including radiation shield (95%), habitat, and atmosphere)
 Diameter: 
Circumference: 5,623.45 m (3.49 mi)
 Habitation tube diameter: 
 Spokes: 6 spokes of  diameter
 Rotation: 1 revolution per minute

Gallery

See also

Asteroid mining
Bernal sphere
Colonization of the Moon
Rotating wheel space station
O'Neill cylinder
Bishop ring
Space colonization
 In fiction
Aurora (novel)
Gaea trilogy
Ringworld
Interstellar (film)
Elysium (film)

References

External links

Visualisation of stanford torus construction from an asteroid mining facility in 2010 

Space habitats
Megastructures
Hypothetical technology